Michael Ogungbaro (born 10 July 1996) is a Nigerian footballer who plays as a defensive midfielder for Finnish club KTP.

Career
He moved to Norway and FK Jerv from Midtjylland ahead of the 2016 season. Bought by IK Start in 2018, he was immediately loaned out to Åsane in the entire 2018 season and Jerv in the first half of 2019. 

In the 2019 Start released him, only to see him being picked up by Slovene club NK Bravo. He made his Slovenian Prva Liga debut in September 2019 against NK Rudar Velenje.

References

1996 births
Living people
Nigerian footballers
Association football midfielders
FK Jerv players
Åsane Fotball players
NK Bravo players
Kotkan Työväen Palloilijat players
Norwegian First Division players
Slovenian PrvaLiga players
Ykkönen players
Veikkausliiga players
Nigerian expatriate footballers
Expatriate men's footballers in Denmark
Nigerian expatriate sportspeople in Denmark
Expatriate footballers in Norway
Nigerian expatriate sportspeople in Norway
Expatriate footballers in Slovenia
Nigerian expatriate sportspeople in Slovenia
Expatriate footballers in Finland
Nigerian expatriate sportspeople in Finland